The list of ship commissionings in 1811 includes a chronological list of ships commissioned in 1811.  In cases where no official commissioning ceremony was held, the date of service entry may be used instead.


References

See also 

1811
 Ship decommissionings
 Ship decommissionings
Ship decommissionings